Stefan Pokorny is an Austrian karateka. He is a three-time bronze medalist in the men's kumite 67 kg event at the European Karate Championships.

Career 

At the 2016 World University Karate Championships held in Braga, Portugal, he won the silver medal in the men's kumite 67 kg event.

In 2018, he competed in the men's 67 kg event at the World Karate Championships in Madrid, Spain. He also represented Austria at the 2019 European Games in Minsk, Belarus.

In May 2021, he won one of the bronze medals in the men's kumite 67 kg event at the European Karate Championships held in Poreč, Croatia. In June 2021, he competed at the World Olympic Qualification Tournament held in Paris, France hoping to qualify for the 2020 Summer Olympics in Tokyo, Japan.

Achievements

References

External links 
 

Living people
Year of birth missing (living people)
Place of birth missing (living people)
Austrian male karateka
Karateka at the 2019 European Games
European Games competitors for Austria
21st-century Austrian people